Lebanon Community Schools, also known as Lebanon Community School District 9, is a public school district serving Lebanon, Oregon, United States, and the surrounding area of Linn County, including the cities of Sodaville and Waterloo and the unincorporated communities of Berlin, Crowfoot, Fairview and Lacomb.

Demographics
In the 2009 school year, the district had 321 students classified as homeless by the Department of Education, which was 7.4% of students in the district.

High school
 Lebanon High School

Middle schools
 Hamilton Creek School (K-8)
 Lacomb School
 Pioneer School (K-8)
 Seven Oak Middle School
 Sand Ridge Charter School
 East linn Christian academy

Elementary schools
 Cascades School
 Green Acres School
 Hamilton Creek School (K-8)
 Pioneer School (K-6)
 Riverview
 east linn Christian academy

Charter school
 Sand Ridge Charter School (K-12)

See also
 Santiam Academy

References

External links
 Official website

School districts in Oregon
Education in Linn County, Oregon
Lebanon, Oregon